Bold Peak is a  mountain in the U.S. state of Alaska, located in Chugach State Park in Anchorage Municipality.

Location
Bold Peak sits on the eastern side of the head of Eklutna Lake, about two and a half miles northwest of Bashful Peak, the highest point in the western Chugach Mountains.

Outdoor Recreation and Climbing Routes
Bold Peak is a popular destination for strong, experienced hikers. Conditions on Bold Peak can be challenging and can include high wind, high exposure, cold temperatures, and year-round snow. The standard route up Stiver's Gully involves a 10.5 mile bike ride in along the dirt road that leads to the head of Eklutna Lake, followed by approximately 6,500 vertical feet of scrambling, climbing, and hiking up loose rock to the summit. There is no trail, maintained or otherwise, to the top of the peak.

The Bold Ridge trail starts from the road running along Eklutna Lake, and climbs 3.5 miles up an old roadway to a tundra valley below Bold Peak's western face. The trail offers sweeping views of Eklutna Lake and access to open tundra hiking in the smaller mountains and valleys below Bold Peak. Bold Peak is rarely climbed from the Overlook Trail because the peak's western face is steep and prone to rockfall, though it may be climbed from the Overlook trail via its northern ridge.

During winter and into spring, Bold Peak's long, steep slopes and heavy snow loads make it prone to extreme avalanches, which can cross and bury the dirt road that runs along Eklutna Lake's northeastern side. In February 2000, an avalanche on Bold Peak's southwestern face "snapped thousands of two-foot-thick aspens and cottonwoods and created a mile-long field of debris". The slide "ripped out vegetation, windmilling whole trees so that they shattered and snapped into rails. At the base of the mountain, a tsunami of wind and snow and wood crossed the road, tearing into a forest that had stood for many decades. The slide then fanned out onto the flats, mowing down about 120 acres of mature spruce-birch forest and reaching about a half-mile into the valley. The force dissipated; a cloud of powder must have risen like a thunderhead."

References

External links
 Lost in Alaska blog post "Autumn's almost over; Ascent of Bold Peak, 'First Attempt', 7522 feet", a trip report with photos.
 Alaska Adventures by Trond blog post, "Bold Peak, 2004", a trip report with many photos of the Stiver's Gully route and the surrounding landscape.
 AK Mountain blog post by William Finley, "Bold Peak", a trip report with numerous photos.

Mountains of Alaska
Mountains of Anchorage, Alaska